The Kocaeli Subregion (Turkish: Kocaeli Alt Bölgesi) (TR42) is a statistical subregion in Turkey.

Provinces 

 Kocaeli Province (TR421)
 Sakarya Province (TR422)
 Düzce Province (TR423)
 Bolu Province (TR424)
 Yalova Province (TR425)

See also 

 NUTS of Turkey

External links 
 TURKSTAT

Sources 
 ESPON Database

Statistical subregions of Turkey